Twin Lake Township may refer to the following townships in the United States:

 Twin Lake Township, Hancock County, Iowa
 Twin Lake Township, Benson County, North Dakota

See also 
 Twin Lakes Township (disambiguation)